The Global Network Initiative (GNI) is a non-governmental organization with the dual goals of preventing Internet censorship by authoritarian governments and protecting the Internet privacy rights of individuals. It is sponsored by a coalition of multinational corporations, non-profit organizations, and universities.

History

On October 29, 2008, the Global Network Initiative (GNI) was founded upon its "Principles of Freedom of Expression and Privacy".  The Initiative was launched in the 60th anniversary year of the Universal Declaration of Human Rights (UDHR), and is based on internationally recognized laws and standards for human rights on freedom of expression and privacy set out in the UDHR, the International Covenant on Civil and Political Rights (ICCPR) and the International Covenant on Economic, Social and Cultural Rights (ICESCR).

Profile
As a human rights organization, GNI seeks to safeguard freedom of expression and personal privacy against government restrictions. The protections are facilitated by a coalition of companies, investors, civil society organizations, academics, and other stakeholders.

GNI esteems freedom of expression and privacy each as a "human right and guarantor of human dignity".  Participants are expected to respect and protect information available to users and users' ability to freely create and distribute information, provided that they operate outside narrowly defined circumstances necessary to adhere to international laws and standards set by the International Covenant on Civil and Political Rights (ICCPR).

Participants are also expected to protect users' personal information from illegal or arbitrary interference when confronted with government demands, laws, or regulations that compromise a user's privacy. The same principle of adherence of international laws and standards applies.

Collaboration among stakeholders is key to the goals of the Global Network Initiative. The GNI's outline of principles encourages participants to explore ways to engage governments advance their cause, individually or collectively.

GNI recognizes that the actions of their corporate participants alone cannot guarantee the protection of human rights. One fundamental commitment is to promote the adoption of laws, policies, and practices that protect freedom of expression and privacy. GNI considers governments to be ultimately responsible for the fulfillment of their citizens' human rights, specifically pursuant to freedom of expression and privacy.

Staff and Board of Directors 
Judith Lichtenberg, Executive Director
Mark Stephens (solicitor), Independent Chair

ICT Companies:
Miranda Sissons, Facebook
Lewis Segall, Google
Steve Crown, Microsoft/LinkedIn
Fiona Cura-Pitre, Nokia
Yves Nissim, Orange
Anita Househam, Telenor Group
Patrik Hiselius, Telia Company
Nicole Karlebach, Verizon Media
Laura Okkonen, Vodafone Group

Civil Society Organizations:
Greg Nojeim, Center for Democracy & Technology
Robert Mahoney, Committee to Protect Journalists
Charles Bradley, Global Partners Digital
Julie Owono, Internet sans Frontières
Kat Duffy, Internews

Academics and Academic Organizations:
Jessica Fjeld, Berkman Klein Center
Meg Roggensack, Georgetown University (Independent)
K.S. Park, Korea University Law School (Independent)

Investors"
Adam Kanzer, BNP Paribas Asset Management
Bennett Freeman, EIRIS Conflict Risk Network

The Following members serve as Alternate Board Members:
ICT Company Alternates:
Moira Oliver, BT Group
Théo Jaekel, Ericsson
Alex Warofka, Facebook
Alexandria Walden, Google
Bernard Shen, Microsoft/LinkedIn
Silvia Garrigo, Millicom
Christoph Steck, Telefónica
Dorothee D’Herde, Vodafone Group

Civil Society Organization Alternates:
Emma Llansó, Center for Democracy & Technology
Elonnai Hickok, Centre for Internet and Society
Usama Khilji, Bolo Bhi
Arvind Ganesan, Human Rights Watch
Andreas Reventlow, International Media Support

Academic Alternates:
Chinmayi Arun, (Independent)
Agustina Del Campo, Centro de Estudios en Libertad de Expresión
Molly Land, UConn Human Rights Institute

Investor Alternate:
Lauren Compere, Boston Common Asset Management

Participants
The Global Network Initiative requires participating companies to integrate their principles deeply into their decision-making and culture.  GNI's founding companies include Google, Yahoo (now Oath Inc.), and Microsoft. Facebook joined GNI in 2013. In 2017, seven telecommunications operator and vendor companies joined GNI.

Notes and references

External links
 Global Network Initiative official site
 GNI Participants

Civil liberties advocacy groups
Computer law organizations
Foundations based in the United States
Intellectual property activism
Internet-related activism
Organizations established in 2008
Politics and technology
Privacy organizations
Internet censorship